The St. Andrews Patrol Cabin was built by the National Park Service in 1922 as part of a network of stations near the boundaries of Mount Rainier National Park for rangers on patrol. The one-room log structure stands along St. Andrews Creek and St. Andrews Creek Trail near the Westside Road and the western boundary of the national park. The exterior of the cabin features a porch to the front.  The interior is finished with varnished logs and tongue and groove flooring.  The cabin was placed on the National Register of Historic Places on March 13, 1991. It is part of the Mount Rainier National Historic Landmark District, which encompasses the entire park and which recognizes the park's inventory of Park Service-designed rustic architecture.

References

Park buildings and structures on the National Register of Historic Places in Washington (state)
Residential buildings completed in 1922
Buildings and structures in Pierce County, Washington
Ranger stations in Mount Rainier National Park
Wonderland Trail shelters
Log cabins in the United States
National Register of Historic Places in Mount Rainier National Park
Log buildings and structures on the National Register of Historic Places in Washington (state)
1922 establishments in Washington (state)
National Park Service rustic in Washington (state)